Mohammed Martin Mensah (born 3 July 1981) is a Ghanaian football midfielder who played for F.C. Zob Ahan in Iran's Premier Football League.

Career
He previously played for Liberty Professionals FC.

International
Mensah attracted interest from Iranian clubs following a friendly between the Ghana under-23 side and Iran played on June 28, 2007, in Tehran.

References

Ghanaian footballers
Ghanaian expatriate footballers
Expatriate footballers in Iran
Zob Ahan Esfahan F.C. players
1981 births
Living people
Association football midfielders